Orange Peel was a Thoroughbred stallion that had a significant influence on the breeding of sport horses.

Orange Peel has had a great influence on the breeding of show jumpers. Orange Peel sired 19 sons from 1924 to 1940, and his descendants are very successful today, with 26 of the top 100 show jumping sires of 1990 having him in their pedigree.

One of Orange Peel's greatest descendants was his grandson, the Anglo-Norman Ibrahim, who produced such great sires as Quastor (1960) and Almé Z (1966). Sons of Orange Peel include The Last Orange, the sire of Ibrahim, Jus de Pomme, and Plein d'Espoirs.

External links
 Orange Peel's pedigree

Show jumping horses
Sport horse sires
1919 animal births
Thoroughbred family 2-u
Individual male horses